Silver Circle may refer to:

 Silver Circle (film), a 2013 American animated thriller film
 Silver Circle (law firms), a group of corporate law firms headquartered in London, United Kingdom
 Silver Circle Celebration, an Emmy Award celebration honoring industry veterans